COP9 signalosome complex subunit 7b is a protein that in humans is encoded by the COPS7B gene.

References

External links

Further reading